The 1982 Mid-American Conference baseball tournament took place in May 1982. The top two regular season finishers from each division met in the double-elimination tournament held at Franklin County Stadium in Columbus, Ohio. This was the second Mid-American Conference postseason tournament to determine a champion. , the second seed from the West, won their second tournament championship to earn the conference's automatic bid to the 1982 NCAA Division I baseball tournament.

Seeding and format 
The top two finishers from each division, based on conference winning percentage only, participated in the tournament. The top seed from each division played the second seed from the other division in the double-elimination tournament.

Results

References 

Tournament
Mid-American Conference Baseball Tournament
Mid-American Conference baseball tournament
Mid-American Conference baseball tournament